Carl Fredrik Stefan Schön (born 11 July 1987) is a heavyweight Greco-Roman wrestler from Sweden. He reached semifinals in the 98 kg weight division at the 2016 Olympics, but lost both the semifinal and the repechage matches.

References

External links
 

1987 births
Living people
Olympic wrestlers of Sweden
Wrestlers at the 2016 Summer Olympics
Swedish male sport wrestlers
21st-century Swedish people